Chunaoti  is a 1980 Bollywood film starring Dharmendra, Feroz Khan, Neetu Singh in lead roles.

Cast

Soundtrack 
Lyrics: Verma Malik

External links 
 

1980 films
1980s Hindi-language films
Films scored by Laxmikant–Pyarelal